Bengt Waller (12 August 1935 – 21 November 2021) was a Swedish sailor. He competed in the Flying Dutchman event at the 1960 Summer Olympics. Waller died on 21 November 2021, at the age of 86.

References

External links
 

1935 births
2021 deaths
Olympic sailors of Sweden
Sailors at the 1960 Summer Olympics – Flying Dutchman
Sportspeople from Gothenburg
Swedish male sailors (sport)